Demetrius Deron Crawford (born December 30, 1986) is a former gridiron football running back. He played college football at Montana State.

Early years 
Crawford attended Vanden High School in Fairfield, California. In 2002 Crawford started at Cornerback as a sophomore earning 96 tackles. Crawford Rushed for 1,300 yards as a junior and 1,500 yards as a senior. In 2003 Crawford rushed for 336 yards and five touchdowns in a game against Angelo Rodriguez High School where he played against friend Stevie Johnson. Crawford earned CVC offensive back of the year honors as a junior and Red Zone Player of the Year honors in his senior season in 2005. Crawford was a 3-year Varsity letterman.

College career 
Crawford attended City College of San Francisco in 2005 and Sacramento City College in 2006 before transferring to Montana State University. In his first season with the program, he gained 868 yards on the season, with 5 touchdowns also caught 35 passes for 285 yards and 2 touchdowns. Crawford was selected to the Second Team All-Big Sky in 2007. The 2008 season was extraordinary for Crawford as he rushed for 1,314 yards, and 8 touchdowns. Crawford also had 100-yard kickoff return for a touchdown against Minnesota. Crawford put together the fifth-best rushing season in school history. Crawford's 2,182 career rushing yards moved him into seventh in school history. Crawford became the first Bobcat since 2001 to have a 1,000 yard season.  Crawford was the first Bobcat running back to earn First Team All-Big Sky honors since 2002. Crawford also was a two-time Big Sky Conference Player of the Week.

Career statistics 
College Statistics from ESPN.com

Rushing

Receiving

Kick Returns

Professional career

Tri-Cities Fever
After going undrafted in 2009 Crawford played in the Indoor Football League with the Tri-Cities Fever for the 2010 football season. Crawford played only 2 games before getting a contract with the BC Lions of the Canadian Football League but was unable to participate in camp due to injury.

Saskatchewan Roughriders 
Crawford was signed by the Saskatchewan Roughriders on February 10, 2012. He was released by the Riders on June 16, 2012.

Personal 
After spending a year out of football, Crawford put out a motivational video with amateur film-maker Eric Gomes on YouTube entitled #DreamChasersNeverSleep. The video shows Crawford working out in the weight room, on the football field, and a beach. Crawford took to Twitter where he send out this video to different teams specifically the Saskatchewan Roughriders hoping to gain interest. Crawford gained the interest he was looking for with the Canadian Football League franchise and was then signed.

References

External links 
Saskatchewan Roughriders bio
Demetrius Crawford on Twitter

1986 births
Living people
African-American players of American football
African-American players of Canadian football
American football running backs
BC Lions players
Canadian football running backs
Montana State Bobcats football players
People from Fairfield, California
Players of American football from Oakland, California
Saskatchewan Roughriders players
Tri-Cities Fever players